Jozef Barmoš (born 28 August 1954) is a former Slovak football coach and former player. He played in defence for Czechoslovakia, and won 52 international caps.

After winning the European Championships in 1976, Barmoš played for Czechoslovakia at both Euro 80 and Espana 82. At the latter tournament, he scored an own goal as the Czechoslovaks lost 2–0 to England in Bilbao, during the first round of the competition.

He managed the Slovak U21 national team, Žilina and Inter Bratislava.

References

External links
 
 Profile at Hall of Fame Dukla Praha website

1954 births
Living people
People from Šurany
Sportspeople from the Nitra Region
Czechoslovak footballers
Czechoslovakia international footballers
1982 FIFA World Cup players
Slovak footballers
UEFA Euro 1976 players
UEFA Euro 1980 players
UEFA European Championship-winning players
FK Inter Bratislava players
Dukla Prague footballers
Slovak football managers
MŠK Žilina managers
Slovak Super Liga managers
FK Inter Bratislava managers
Slovakia national under-21 football team managers
Association football defenders